Agustín José Urzi (born 4 May 2000) is an Argentine professional footballer who plays as a left winger for Banfield.

Club career
Urzi's career began in the system of Argentine Primera División side Banfield, joining the club's academy in 2008. He started appearing in their first-team squad during the 2018–19 season under manager Julio César Falcioni, who selected the forward on the substitutes bench on 25 November 2018, for a fixture with Racing Club; though he was unused. A week later, on 1 December, Urzi made his professional debut in a home defeat to Argentinos Juniors; featuring for the last twenty-seven minutes, having been subbed on in place of Nicolás Silva. He ended the 2018–19 campaign with goals in games against Atlético Tucumán and Newell's Old Boys.

International career
Urzi trained with the Argentina U19s in March 2018. He was selected by them for the 2018 South American Games in Bolivia, a competition in which he was notably sent off during a semi-final defeat to Uruguay. Urzi was called up by Fernando Batista's U20s in May 2019 for the FIFA U-20 World Cup in Poland. He played in all four of Argentina's fixtures in Poland, as they reached the round of sixteen. Also in 2019, Urzi was picked by the U23s for the Pan American Games in Peru. Urzi appeared in four matches, including in the final against Honduras when he also scored, as they won the trophy. In 2020, Urzi scored one goal in six games as Argentina won the 2020 CONMEBOL Pre-Olympic Tournament.

Career statistics

Honours
Argentina U23
 Pan American Games: 2019
 Pre-Olympic Tournament: 2020

References

External links
 Agustín José Urzi at the 2019 Pan American Games
 
 
 
 
 

2000 births
Living people
People from Lomas de Zamora
Argentine footballers
Argentina youth international footballers
Argentina under-20 international footballers
Footballers at the 2019 Pan American Games
Pan American Games gold medalists for Argentina
Pan American Games medalists in football
Medalists at the 2019 Pan American Games
Olympic footballers of Argentina
Footballers at the 2020 Summer Olympics
Association football wingers
Argentine Primera División players
Club Atlético Banfield footballers
Sportspeople from Buenos Aires Province
Argentine people of Italian descent